The Polish alphabet (Polish:) is the script of the Polish language, the basis for the Polish system of orthography. It is based on the Latin alphabet but includes certain letters with diacritics: the acute accent; the overdot; the tail or ogonek; and the stroke.

Modified variations of the Polish alphabet are used for writing Silesian and Kashubian, whereas the Sorbian languages use a mixture of Polish and Czech orthography.

Letters
There are 32 letters in the Polish alphabet: 9 vowels and 23 consonants.

In addition, they can occasionally be found in common abbreviations (e.g.,  'priest' can be abbreviated as either  or ). As a result, they are sometimes included in the Polish alphabet (bringing the total number of letters in the alphabet to 35); when included, they take their usual positions from the Latin alphabet ( after ;  and  either side of ). 

The following table lists the letters of the alphabet, their Polish names (see also Names of letters below), the Polish spelling alphabet name, the Polish phonemes which they usually represent (and rough equivalents for them), other possible pronunciations, and letter frequencies. Diacritics are shown for the sake of clarity. For more information about the sounds, see Polish phonology.

 For English speakers who end the word with a nasal vowel and not a consonant.
 Sequences  may be pronounced as geminates .

 was historically used in native words prior to the 1891 spelling reform by the Academy of Learning, e.g.,  (now  'four',  'pope'). Now it is used in some loanwords, e.g., .

For digraphs and other rules about spelling and the corresponding pronunciations, see Polish orthography.

Names of letters 
The spoken Polish names of the letters are given in the table under Letters above.

The names of the letters are not normally written out in the way shown above, except as part of certain lexicalized abbreviations, such as Pekao (or PeKaO), the name of a bank, which represents the spoken form of the abbreviation P.K.O. (for ).

Some letters may be referred to in alternative ways, often consisting of just the sound of the letter.

When giving the spelling of words, certain letters may be said in more emphatic ways to distinguish them from other identically pronounced characters.

Alphabetical order
Polish alphabetical ordering uses the order of letters as in the table under Letters above.

Note that (unlike in languages such as French, Spanish, and German) Polish letters with diacritics are treated as fully independent letters in alphabetical ordering. For example,  comes after .

Digraphs are not given any special treatment in alphabetical ordering.

Computer encoding
There are several systems for encoding the Polish alphabet for computers. All letters of the Polish alphabet are included in Unicode, and thus Unicode-based encodings such as UTF-8 and UTF-16 can be used. The Polish alphabet is completely included in the Basic Multilingual Plane of Unicode. The standard 8-bit character encoding for the Polish alphabet is ISO 8859-2 (Latin-2), although both ISO 8859-13 (Latin-7) and ISO 8859-16 (Latin-10) encodings include glyphs of the Polish alphabet. Microsoft's format for encoding the Polish alphabet is Windows-1250.

The Polish letters which are not present in the English alphabet have the following HTML codes and Unicode codepoints:

For other encodings, see Polish code pages, but also Combining Diacritical Marks Unicode block.

A common test sentence containing all the Polish diacritic letters is the nonsensical  ('Yellow the ego with/of a gusle').

See also
Polish orthography
Polish braille
Cyrillization of Polish
Polish manual alphabet

Notes

References

Further reading

External links
Polish Alphabet & Pronunciation
Polish Pronunciation Audio and Grammar Charts
Online editor for typing Polish characters
A Foreigner's Guide to the Polish Alphabet, interactive listen-along guide from Culture.pl

Latin alphabets
Alphabet
!